Arthur Lee Stevenson (May 7, 1926 – May 7, 1991), known as Kansas City Red, was an American blues drummer and vocalist who played a major role in the development of urban blues. He performed and recorded with many notable blues artists, such as David "Honeyboy" Edwards, Robert Nighthawk, Sunnyland Slim, and Walter Horton.

Biography

Stevenson was born in Drew, Mississippi. After he was rejected for military service in 1942, he took a brief trip to Kansas City and became known Kansas City Red. David "Honeyboy" Edwards was his first musical influence. He started following Robert Nighthawk in the early 1940s, and when Nighthawk's drummer was ill and unable to play a gig, Red offered to fill in, even though he had never played drums. He was Nighthawk's drummer until around 1946. Nighthawk recorded Red's song “The Moon Is Rising”. Red became part of Sonny Boy Williamson II's inner circle, playing on the famed King Biscuit radio show in Helena, Arkansas.  
He had brushes with the law and trouble with women and jealous boyfriends in the South and in California before moving to southern Illinois.

He moved to Chicago in the 1950s and was a regular performer in Chicago blues clubs, playing with Johnny Shines, Walter Horton, Sunnyland Slim, Earl Hooker, Blind John Davis, Johnny "Man" Young, Robert Lockwood, Jr., Eddie Taylor, Floyd Jones, Elmore James, and Easy Baby (Alex Randall), among others. He briefly played with Honeyboy Edwards, and in the 1950s he formed a band with Earl Hooker. He led his own bands, including one in which Jimmy Reed gained some early professional experience. He owned and operated well-known clubs on Chicago's West Side, such as the Boola Boola, the Shangri-La, and the Club Reno.

Music and performance style

Red's music career lasted more than 40 years. The blues reviewer David Whiteis wrote that Red's vulnerable personality likely prevented his career from breaking out of the local circuit. According to Whiteas, Red was known to openly weep when he sang "I Am a Prisoner", a song he wrote about the time he spent in jail in 1980.  However, Whiteis stated that Red "played a major role in transforming the blues from a southern tradition to a forward-looking urban form." Whiteis described his drumming style as “one of the most identifiable in Chicago Blues, 'busy and eccentric… punctuated by cymbal crashes" and controlled in with drum rolls. His signature solo, "Freedom Train", was marked by explosive drumming unanticipated in the middle of a slow blues shuffle. Whiteis wrote that Red's "legacy transcend[ed] his musical contributions" by virtue of his owning various clubs, his encouragement of artists and listeners from diverse backgrounds, and his "warm and amiable" style as emcee of his ongoing jam sessions in numerous clubs, including B.L.U.E.S. and the V and J Lounge, which were attended by musicians and fans from throughout Chicago.

Discography

References

1926 births
1991 deaths
American blues drummers
Blues musicians from Mississippi
Chicago blues musicians
American blues singers
JSP Records artists
P-Vine Records artists
Earwig Music artists
20th-century African-American male singers